The Scaled Particle Theory (SPT) is an equilibrium theory of hard-sphere fluids which gives an approximate expression for the equation of state of hard-sphere mixtures and for their thermodynamic properties such as the surface tension.

One-component case 

Consider the one-component homogeneous hard-sphere fluid with molecule radius .

The chemical potential of the fluid can be written as a sum of an ideal-gas contribution and an excess part: . The excess chemical potential is equivalent to the reversible work of inserting an additional molecule into the fluid. Note that inserting a spherical particle of radius  is equivalent to creating a cavity of radius  in the hard-sphere fluid. The SPT theory gives an approximate expression for this work . In case of inserting a molecule  it is

,

where  is the packing fraction,  is the Boltzmann constant.

This leads to the equation of state

which is equivalent to the compressibility equation of state of the Percus-Yevick theory.

References 

Statistical mechanics